Lucia Moris (born 23 March 2001) is an athlete from South Sudan who specialises in the 100 and 200 metre races.

In June 2021, under the universality rule within the Olympic qualifying criteria which allows smaller nations with developing sports programs to send representatives to the competition she was confirmed as being selected for the delayed 2020 Summer Olympics. In November 2019, prior to the original date of the games Moris was training in Japan with the South Sudan squad in the city of Maebashi in preparation for the event and were able to stay there and train during the Covid-19 pandemic with the city sponsoring their extended stay. Speaking to Vice, Moris was quoted as saying “It’s very different from home and I miss my family and friends, but I want to compete at the highest level.” At the games she was given the honour of being a flag bearer for her nation in the opening ceremony.

References

2001 births
Living people
South Sudanese female sprinters
Athletes (track and field) at the 2020 Summer Olympics
Olympic athletes of South Sudan
Olympic female sprinters